The 2016 Clarkson Cup was a women's ice hockey championship that was contested at Canadian Tire Centre in Ottawa, Ontario, the first contested on NHL ice, to determine the champion of the Canadian Women's Hockey League. Held on March 13, 2016, the Calgary Inferno defeated the Canadiennes de Montreal 8-3 to claim their first title. Blayre Turnbull, Brianne Jenner, Jessica Campbell and Rebecca Johnston each scored twice. The first goal scored by an Inferno player was Rebecca Johnston while Blayre Turnbull was credited with the Cup winning goal. Goaltender Delayne Brian was recognized as the Most Valuable Player.

Calgary Inferno – 2016 Clarkson Cup champions

Defenders
4 Brigitte Lacquette 
5 Kanae Aoki 
8 Erica Kromm  
11 Jacqui Pierri  
12 Meaghan Mikkelson 
16 Kristen Hagg 
24 Hayleigh Cudmore 

Forwards
6 Rebecca Johnston (Assistant Captain) 
7 Brittany Esposito 
9 Sarah Davis  
14 Jenna Cunningham 
15 Elana Lovell 
17 Bailey Bram  (Assistant Captain) 
18 Aina Takeuchi 
19 Brianne Jenner  (Captain) 
20 Jessica Campbell  
22 Hayley Wickenheiser  
26 Blayre Turnbull 
27 Jillian Saulnier 
28 Louise Warren 

Goaltenders
1 Kathy Desjardins   
30 Delayne Brian 

Coaching and Administrative Staff
Chantal Champagne (General Manager)
Scott Reid  (Head coach)
Gina Kingsbury (Assistant coach)

Awards and honours
Most Valuable Player, Delayne Brian,  Calgary Inferno
First Star of the Game, Delayne Brian
Second Star of the Game, Rebecca Johnston, Calgary Inferno
Third Star of the Game, Blayre Turnbull, Calgary Inferno

References

2016
2015–16 in women's ice hockey
Ice hockey in Ottawa